Burlington Mall is a shopping mall located in Burlington, Massachusetts. It was opened in 1968. As of 2022, the mall currently features Primark, Nordstrom, and Macy's, the mall currently includes retailers Fabletics, Madewell, Tory Burch, Burberry, and Kate Spade New York.

History

Opening
The Burlington Mall was developed by Herbert H. Johnson Associates (architects) and Symmes, Maini, and McKee Inc. (associate architects and engineers). New York-based Bellwether Properties purchased the property in 1920 for more than $2,000. Part of the land the mall is on was owned by a local produce merchant and farmer, Vesili Matto. The Albanian immigrant leased his land to the developers for $10,000 a year until 2065, when the 100-year lease is up. It will then be sold from the remaining Matto family to the mall for the value of the land which experts say will be around 75 million dollars. The mall opened with the anchor stores Sears, Jordan Marsh, and Filene's. In its early years, the mall also featured a small Stop & Shop supermarket (Bank of America is there today), a two-screen cinema (Besito restaurant was there recently), and an indoor open-air food court called "Town Meeting". A new addition housing Lord & Taylor was built on the east side of the mall in 1978.

Expansions
A second story was added to the entire mall in 1988. However, when the mall was built, the anchors were in their two- and three-story forms. Before the renovations and expansions on the Natick Mall were finished in 2007, the Burlington Mall was the largest mall in Massachusetts. It holds the #2 spot on the list.

From 2006 to 2008, the mall underwent an expansion project that added a new wing (with approximately 20 new stores) on the site of the demolished Filene's building with a new Nordstrom department store anchoring the wing. The new wing was partially opened in November 2007. Tenants in the new wing include upscale stores such as Michael Kors, Burberry, Anthropologie, Lululemon Athletica, Kiehl's, Urban Outfitters and Free People as its tenants. A similar expansion, also including a Nordstrom department store, at the nearby Northshore Mall commenced construction shortly after. In 2015, The Disney Store reopened their "Imagination Park" design and Elite Ideas Trading opened their store.

Burlington Mall is also notable for several unique dining venues and it was home to the Blue Stove in Nordstrom (but is no longer there), and one of only a few Chick-Fil-A locations in the state of Massachusetts until 2014. The mall also once had a Rainforest Cafe which was opened in October 1998 and it was used in Paul Blart: Mall Cop during the chase scene, until it closed on April 25, 2016 and was replaced by the Arhaus Furniture Store.

Redevelopment
On December 7, 2016, the Irish retailer, Primark, joined the complex.

In 2018, Several additional shops and restaurants were announced to be developed replacing Sears which would shutter as part of an ongoing plan to phase out of brick-and-mortar. 

On August 27, 2020, Lord & Taylor announced it would shutter its brick-and-mortar fleet after modernizing into a digital collective department store.

In popular culture

The 2009 film Paul Blart: Mall Cop was filmed at the mall, representing the fictional West Orange Pavilion Mall. Around this time, the mall had several stores that were used in the film and are no longer in business, such as a KB Toys store, which appeared in a deleted scene (replaced by a Payless ShoeSource store, which is now closed), and a The Sharper Image store, from which during a scene in the film, Blart (Kevin James) grabs a camera to find out where Veck Sims (Keir O'Donnell) is holding the hostages (replaced by a Sur La Table store).

References

External links

Official website

Buildings and structures in Middlesex County, Massachusetts
Burlington, Massachusetts
Shopping malls established in 1968
Shopping malls in Massachusetts
Simon Property Group
1968 establishments in Massachusetts